Steven Means (born September 16, 1990) is an American football outside linebacker for the Baltimore Ravens of the National Football League (NFL). He was drafted by the Tampa Bay Buccaneers in the fifth round of the 2013 NFL Draft. He played college football for the University at Buffalo.

Means has also played for the Baltimore Ravens, Houston Texans, and Philadelphia Eagles.

Early life
Means was born in Buffalo, New York. He attended Grover Cleveland High School, where he participated on the basketball, track and field, swimming and football teams.
Means' father, Steven Means Sr., played football at Buffalo State College. Means has two younger brothers, Brandon and Cameron.

College career
While attending the University at Buffalo, Means was a member of the Buffalo Bulls football team from 2009 to 2012. In four seasons as a defensive end, Means accumulated 186 total tackles, 30.5 tackles for loss, 19.5 sacks, three forced fumbles, two interceptions and five blocked kicks. He majored in human development and family studies.

Professional career

Tampa Bay Buccaneers
On April 27, 2013, Steven Means was drafted by the Tampa Bay Buccaneers in the fifth round (147th overall) in the 2013 NFL Draft. Means signed his contract on May 13, 2013, and also got a $191,752 signing bonus on a four-year deal worth $2,351,752. Means appeared in ten games for the Buccaneers during his rookie campaign in 2013. After appearing in the first game of the following season, Means was waived on September 9. In eleven games with the Buccaneers over two seasons, Means accumulated six tackles and no sacks.

Baltimore Ravens
The Baltimore Ravens signed Means to their practice squad in October 2014. Means appeared in only one game in 2014 after an injury to offensive tackle Rick Wagner created a vacancy on the roster. On May 7, 2015, Means accepted a $510,000 exclusive-rights tender offer from the Ravens. On September 2, 2015, after suffering a sports hernia, Means was released by the Ravens with an injury settlement.

Houston Texans
On October 20, 2015, the Houston Texans signed Means to their practice squad.

Philadelphia Eagles
On December 8, 2015, Means was signed by the Philadelphia Eagles off the Texans' practice squad.

In 2016, the Eagles chose to retain Means following a strong preseason showing. Means was active for the first three weeks of the season and recorded his first solo tackle since his rookie year. Following a Week 4 bye, Means was placed on the inactive list. In a Week 7 game against the Minnesota Vikings, Means, active again due to an injury to Bennie Logan, recorded his first career sack, which also caused Sam Bradford to fumble.

On August 30, 2017, Means signed a one-year contract extension with the Eagles. Means won Super Bowl LII after the Eagles defeated the New England Patriots 41-33.

On September 1, 2018, Means was released by the Eagles.

Atlanta Falcons
On September 10, 2018, Means signed with the Atlanta Falcons. He played in eight games with four starts, recording 14 combined tackles and one sack.

On February 13, 2019, Means signed a one-year contract extension with the Falcons. On May 22, 2019, Means suffered a season-ending Achilles injury in OTAs and was ruled out for the season.

On March 9, 2020, Means signed a one-year contract extension with the Falcons. He was placed on the reserve/COVID-19 list by the team on August 29, 2020. On September 8, 2020, Means was activated prior to the season opener against the Seattle Seahawks. In Week 12 against the Las Vegas Raiders, Means recorded a strip sack on Derek Carr that was recovered by teammate LaRoy Reynolds during the 43–6 win. In 2020 while with the Falcons, Means was the team's recipient of the 2020 Ed Block Courage Award. The award is given to select NFL players who are voted by their teammates as role models of inspiration, courage, and sportsmanship.

On April 1, 2021, Means re-signed with the Falcons on a one-year contract. In Week 9, Means recovered a fumble and returned it for 32 yards thanks to a James Vaughters strip sack on Trevor Siemian in a 27-25 win over the Saints. Means suffered a knee injury as he was tackled from behind by Saints receiver Tre'Quan Smith. He was placed on injured reserve on November 14, 2021. He was activated on December 4.

Baltimore Ravens (second stint)
On June 17, 2022, Means signed with the Baltimore Ravens. He was released on August 30, 2022 and signed to the practice squad the next day. On September 14, the Ravens signed Means to the active roster. He suffered a torn Achilles in Week 2 and was placed on injured reserve on September 19, ending his season.

Personal life
Means grew up a fan of his hometown Buffalo Bills, but admitted to feeling slighted by the organization for passing on him in the draft. He has done charity work for his high school, albeit under the radar. Means is a Christian.

References

External links
 
 Buffalo Bulls bio

1990 births
Living people
Players of American football from Buffalo, New York
American football linebackers
American football defensive ends
Buffalo Bulls football players
Tampa Bay Buccaneers players
Baltimore Ravens players
Philadelphia Eagles players
Houston Texans players
Atlanta Falcons players
Ed Block Courage Award recipients